Björkekärr is an officially defined district in Gothenburg, Sweden which belongs to the Härlanda borough.
Herbert (ship, 1905) classed as a historical ship by the Swedish National Maritime Museum, is situated 3 km southeast of Björkekärr.

References

Gothenburg
Populated places in Västra Götaland County